Photodisintegration (also called phototransmutation, or a photonuclear reaction) is a nuclear process in which an atomic nucleus absorbs a high-energy gamma ray, enters an excited state, and immediately decays by emitting a subatomic particle. The incoming gamma ray effectively knocks one or more neutrons, protons, or an alpha particle out of the nucleus. The reactions are called (γ,n), (γ,p), and (γ,α).

Photodisintegration is endothermic (energy absorbing) for atomic nuclei lighter than iron and sometimes exothermic (energy releasing) for atomic nuclei heavier than iron. Photodisintegration is responsible for the nucleosynthesis of at least some heavy, proton-rich elements via the p-process in supernovae.
This causes the iron to further fuse into the heavier elements.

Photodisintegration of deuterium
A photon carrying 2.22 MeV or more energy can photodisintegrate an atom of deuterium:
{| border="0"
|- style="height:2em;"
| ||+ || ||→ || ||+ ||
|}
James Chadwick and Maurice Goldhaber used this reaction to measure the proton-neutron mass difference. This experiment proves that a neutron is not a bound state of a proton and an electron, as had been proposed by Ernest Rutherford.

Photodisintegration of beryllium
A photon carrying 1.67 MeV or more energy can photodisintegrate an atom of beryllium-9 (100% of natural beryllium, its only stable isotope):
{| border="0"
|- style="height:2em;"
| ||+ || ||→ ||2||  ||+ ||
|}

Antimony-124 is assembled with beryllium to make laboratory neutron sources and startup neutron sources. Antimony-124 (half-life 60.20 days) emits β− and 1.690MeV gamma rays (also 0.602MeV and 9 fainter emissions from 0.645 to 2.090 MeV), yielding stable tellurium-124. Gamma rays from antimony-124 split beryllium-9 into two alpha particles and a neutron with an average kinetic energy of 24keV, intermediate neutrons. The other products are two alpha particles.

{| border="0"
|- style="height:2em;"
| ||→ ||||+ || ||+ ||
|}

Other isotopes have higher thresholds for photoneutron production, as high as 18.72 MeV, for carbon-12.

Hypernovae
In explosions of very large stars (250 or more solar masses), photodisintegration is a major factor in the supernova event. As the star reaches the end of its life, it reaches temperatures and pressures where photodisintegration's energy-absorbing effects temporarily reduce pressure and temperature within the star's core. This causes the core to start to collapse as energy is taken away by photodisintegration, and the collapsing core leads to the formation of a black hole. A portion of mass escapes in the form of relativistic jets, which could have "sprayed" the first metals into the universe.

Photodisintegration in lightning
Terrestrial lightnings produce high-speed electrons that create bursts of gamma-rays as bremsstrahlung. The energy of these rays is sometimes sufficient to start photonuclear reactions resulting in emitted neutrons. The unstable isotopes remaining from the reaction may subsequently emit positrons by β+ decay.

Photofission
Photofission is a similar but distinct process, in which a nucleus, after absorbing a gamma ray, undergoes nuclear fission (splits into two fragments of nearly equal mass).

See also
 Pair-instability supernova
 Silicon-burning process

References

Nuclear physics
Nucleosynthesis
Neutron sources